Rainsville is the name of several places in the United States:

 Rainsville, Alabama
 Rainsville, Indiana
 Rainsville, New Mexico